The South Dakota Lottery is run by the government of South Dakota. It is a member of the Multi-State Lottery Association (MUSL). The Lottery is headquartered in Pierre; it is a self-funded endeavor. The minimum age to buy tickets is 18; however, video lottery players must be at least 21.

History
 November 4, 1986: South Dakota voters approve a constitutional amendment a lottery. 
 April 2, 1987: The bill to create the Lottery was signed
 October 16, 1989: Video lottery is established
 April 19, 1992: Powerball begins
 November 1992 Voters reject a plan to repeal video lottery
 June 22, 1994: Supreme Court rules video lottery is unconstitutional
 August 13, 1994: Video lottery machines shut down pursuant to court order
 November 8, 1994: Voters approve constitutional amendment to re-authorize video lottery
 November 22, 1994: Video lottery restored
 2000: Voters rejected for a second time to repeal video lottery.
 2006: Voters again rejected repealing video lottery.
 May 16, 2010, South Dakota joins Mega Millions
 January 15, 2012: Enhanced Powerball game begins
 October 19, 2013: Current version of Mega Millions begins
 June 4, 2017: Lucky for Life adds South Dakota

Games
South Dakota's games include:

Multi-state:
Lucky for Life 
Powerball
Mega Millions   
Hot Lotto
South Dakota only: 
Dakota Cash (5/35)
Scratch-offs (each ticket costing $1 to $20)
Raffle (first drawing in 2007)
Video lottery

Dakota Cash
Dakota Cash is drawn Wednesdays and Saturdays. It draws 5 numbers from 1 through 35. Jackpots begin at $20,000. Each game is $1.

Lucky for Life

In 2009, the Connecticut Lottery began a game then called Lucky-4-Life. It eventually became a regional game, taking on its current name. In 2013, Lucky for Life added a second "lifetime" prize tier and began allowing such prizes to be paid in cash. In 2015, LFL further expanded into a quasi-national game. With South Dakota joining on June 4, 2017, LFL now is offered in 23 states and the District of Columbia.

Lucky for Life players choose five white balls numbered 01 through 48 and one green "Lucky Ball" numbered 01 through 18. LFL continues to be drawn in Connecticut with numbered balls and two classic-style drawing machines.

Hot Lotto
Hot Lotto is offered in 14 states. It is drawn Wednesdays and Saturdays. The game draws five "white balls" numbered 1-47, and one orange "Hot Ball", numbered 1-19. Jackpots begin at $1,000,000 (all-cash, and "taxes-paid"). Hot Lotto also has an option called Sizzler; it triples non-jackpot prizes.

Originally, Hot Lotto drew from 39 "white balls"; jackpots were paid in 25 yearly installments unless the cash option was chosen. Unlike Lucky for Life, Hot Lotto numbers are drawn via a random number generator (RNG).

Powerball
Since 1990, South Dakota has been a member of MUSL. Powerball began in 1992. Its jackpots begin at $40 million; it also is drawn Wednesdays and Saturdays.

Mega Millions

On October 13, 2009, the Mega Millions consortium and MUSL reached an agreement in principle to cross-sell Mega Millions and Powerball in US lottery jurisdictions. Most lotteries with either game prior to January 31, 2010 added the other on that date. South Dakota joined Mega Millions on May 16, 2010.

External links 
 South Dakota Lottery

State lotteries of the United States
Economy of South Dakota
Computer-drawn lottery games
Lottery
Companies based in South Dakota